Emily Sophia Wedgwood Benn (born 4 October 1989) is an English local politician, who represents the Ward of Bread Street on the Common Council of the City of London since 2022.

Benn unsuccessfully contested both the 2010 and 2015 UK general elections as a Labour Party parliamentary candidate. At the 2014 local elections, Benn was elected to the West Thornton Ward of Croydon Borough Council, serving until 2016. At the 2022 local elections, she was elected to represent Bread Street Ward on the City Common Council.

The granddaughter of the late Labour MP Tony Benn, she is the eldest child and only daughter of the 3rd Viscount Stansgate by his wife  Nita Clarke (née Bowes).

Early and family life
Born at Croydon, Surrey, where the 1989 Labour Party Conference was being held, as the daughter of a viscount, she is entitled to be styled as The Honourable. Benn is a quarter-Indian on her mother's side Benn claims that her first political experience was campaigning for her grandfather in his Chesterfield constituency during the 1992 general election aged two and she joined the Labour Party at the age of 14.

Four generations of her family have served as British Members of Parliament (MP) – uncle Hilary Benn, grandfather Tony Benn, great-grandfather William Wedgwood Benn and great-great-grandfathers, Sir John Benn and Daniel Holmes.

Education
Benn attended Wallington High School for Girls where she achieved 11 A* grades in her GCSEs. She then studied Music, History and Latin for A-levels at St Olave's Grammar School, Orpington, before going up to read History and Politics at New College, Oxford.

Professional career
After university, Benn joined the graduate training programme at UBS Investment Bank, then the multi-asset sales team at the bank in London. In 2016 she started working for UBS in New York.

In 2018 Benn was a graduate research assistant at the John F. Kennedy School of Government at Harvard University, helping to write a book on ageing demographics with Camilla Cavendish. She later worked as Chief of Staff for Jonathan Powell before becoming Chief of Staff of Tortoise Media.

Political career

Parliamentary candidate
On 12 September 2007, three weeks before her eighteenth birthday, Benn was selected as the Labour Party candidate for the West Sussex constituency of East Worthing and Shoreham at the 2010 general election.

The sitting MP, Conservative Tim Loughton, defending a majority over Labour of 8,183 votes from the 2005 general election, defeated Benn, who finished in third place, 4,276 votes behind the Liberal Democrat candidate in second place, while Loughton increased his majority to 11,105 votes.

On 16 July 2014, Benn was selected as the Labour Party candidate for Croydon South for the 2015 general election. She increased the Labour vote share by 4.8%, but was defeated by Conservative candidate Chris Philp.

Local councillor
In July 2013, Benn was selected as one of three Labour candidates for the Ward of West Thornton on Croydon Borough Council in the 2014 local council elections. In May 2014, she was elected top of the ballot with a majority of 1,777. She resigned as a Councillor in 2016 after accepting a job in New York.

Benn served on the Board of Trustees of the London Youth Games and London Mozart Players.

Benn returned to local politics in 2022, being elected to the Ward of Bread Street on the City of London Common Council as an Independent at the 2022 election.

Andrew Fisher complaint
In the autumn of 2015, Benn formally complained about Andrew Fisher, Jeremy Corbyn's head of policy, for supporting the Class War party at the general election earlier that year; Fisher was suspended. The Guardian also stated that 'Fisher Supporters' had pointed out that a page titled 'Emily Benn for Croydon South' on Facebook published a retweet suggesting Labour members who were '"disappointed" with Corbyn's "male dominated" leadership join the Women's Equality Party.

Electoral history

2022 City of London Corporation election

2015 general election

2010 general election

See also
 City of London Corporation
 Viscount Stansgate

References

1989 births
Living people
People from South Norwood
People from Croydon
People educated at Wallington High School for Girls
Alumni of New College, Oxford
Emily
Daughters of viscounts
English people of American descent
English people of Indian descent
English people of Scottish descent
UBS people
Councillors in the London Borough of Croydon
Labour Party (UK) councillors
Labour Party (UK) parliamentary candidates
Women councillors in England
Councilmen and Aldermen of the City of London
Tony Benn